Boriavi is a city in Anand district  in the state of Gujarat, India.

Demographics
 India census, Boriavi had a population of 45,861. Males constitute 52% of the population and females 48%. Boriavi has an average literacy rate of 66%, higher than the national average of 59.5%; with male literacy of 77% and female literacy of 55%. 13% of the population is under 6 years of age.

Boriavi is mainly known internationally for Mahatma Gandhiji's Dandiyatra as the town was visited and stayed overnight by all the Dandi members and that is the main cause for the Central Government to develop its roads, rail and businesses. The central government has given many projects for its development in education, roads and others. The town is the first for its RO mineral water plant in the total houses of Boriavi for all people 24 hours supplied by its Nagarpalika management.

Boriavi was internationally recognised in 1996-97 when the "Government of Canada" and "Government of India" decided to develop relations between two countries and ran students exchange program in which Canadian government had sent 24 high ranking students to live in sub part of India. At the time of calculating, 3 towns were selected in all over the country of India on the basis of culture, industries, people, education, sustainability, peace and wealth where " Boriavi " was placed into the selection and half of the international guests were stayed in the town for more than 3 months with some of the most prestigious residents of the town. Government of India have made a monument in Boriavi in the memory of relations of Canadian and Indian government.

Boriavi is very well developed for its education culture. It has very good schools and colleges for the surrounding area and the town of Vallabh Vidhyanagar, Anand and Nadiad have also attracted for its students to study in the community of Boriavi.

Every summer, the locals come together to celebrate the 'Batata Festival' when there are many rituals to celebrate the annual potato festival to symbolize fertility and prosperity.

Boriavi is considered as the part of Anand city and the region is very industry friendly. Also it has many industries in food, cement and agriculture. The land of Boriavi is under the " Vegetable Belt of India " and is one of the most prosperous town of India. Boriavi is also known for its unity of people. The overall wealth of Boriavi has attracted many investors from all over the country and that has given the chance to risen the prices of lands in the region. Many industries have their manufacturing and operating plants in the region.

The central government has given " National Research Center on Medicinal  and aromatic plants" funded by Indian Council of Agricultural Research and some subpart laboratories to the region of Boriavi.

Boriavi festivals are famous for its Diwali and Uttarayan (kite flying day).

In Boriavi Transportation Facility is very good. N.H no 8 and Indian Railway and also Anand -Nadiad Approach road facility in Boriavi. There are Many Big Cold storage located here.

References

Cities and towns in Anand district